Palana (Koryak: Ӄычг'эт, Пыльг'ыльг'ын) is an urban locality (an urban-type settlement) in Tigilsky District of Koryak Okrug of Kamchatka Krai, Russia which serves as the administrative center of Koryak Okrug. The settlement is located on the west coast of the Kamchatka Peninsula on the right bank of the Palana River within  from the Sea of Okhotsk. Population:

Administrative and municipal status
Palana is the administrative center of Koryak Okrug in Kamchatka Krai and, within the framework of administrative divisions, it is subordinated to Tigilsky District of Koryak Okrug. As a municipal division, the urban-type settlement of Palana is incorporated as Palana Urban Okrug.

Transportation
It is served by the Palana Airport.

Culture
There are several dance ensembles, both professional and amateur, in Palana.

Media
Internet access is provided by KamchatSvyazInform from Petropavlovsk-Kamchatsky.

Climate
Palana has a subarctic climate (Köppen Dfc), intermediate between those of the Sakha Republic and the eastern coast of the Kamchatka Peninsula. The Sea of Okhotsk freezes during the winter and thus there is less moderation of temperatures during this season than is found on the Pacific side of the peninsula, and the Aleutian Low tends to produce more precipitation.

References

Notes

Sources

Urban-type settlements in Kamchatka Krai
Road-inaccessible communities of Russia